Francis (Frank) Becton (11 May 1873 – 6 November 1909) was an English professional footballer at the turn of the 20th century. An inside forward, he turned out for Preston North End (in two separate spells), Liverpool, Sheffield United, Bedminster, Swindon Town, Ashton Town and New Brighton Tower. He also represented England twice, scoring two goals.

His early death came from tuberculosis.

External links
Profile at LFCHistory.net

1873 births
1909 deaths
Footballers from Preston, Lancashire
English footballers
England international footballers
Association football inside forwards
Preston North End F.C. players
Liverpool F.C. players
Sheffield United F.C. players
Bedminster F.C. players
Swindon Town F.C. players
Nelson F.C. players
Ashton Town A.F.C. players
New Brighton Tower F.C. players
English Football League players
Southern Football League players
English Football League representative players
20th-century deaths from tuberculosis
Tuberculosis deaths in England